William Groenewald Louwrens Janse van Rensburg (April 10, 1939 – August 9, 2008), was the mayor of the city of Johannesburg, South Africa, from 1990 to 1991.

References

Afrikaner people
Mayors of Johannesburg
South African people of Dutch descent
1939 births
2008 deaths